The US Aviation CAVU (named for the aeronautical meteorology term meaning "Ceiling And Visibility Unlimited") is an American high-wing, strut-braced, single-seat, open cockpit, single engine in pusher configuration, ultralight aircraft that was designed and produced by AeroDreams of Manchester, Tennessee, but marketed by US Aviation of St Paul, Minnesota under their brand name. The aircraft was supplied as a kit for amateur construction.

Design and development
The design goals for the CAVU were a simple and inexpensive aircraft, achieving good performance with a small and inexpensive engine.

The aircraft is made from aluminium tubing, wood and fabric. The fuselage is built on an aluminium tube, which supports the tail as well as the pilot's seat. Its  span wing is braced by a single lift strut. The landing gear is tricycle gear.

Estimated assembly time from the kit is 100 hours.

Specifications (CAVU)

See also

References

1990s United States ultralight aircraft
Homebuilt aircraft
Aircraft first flown in 1997
High-wing aircraft
Single-engined pusher aircraft